NorNed is a  long high-voltage direct current submarine power cable between Feda in Norway and the seaport of Eemshaven in the Netherlands, which interconnects both countries' electrical grids. It was once the longest submarine power cable in the world. Budgeted at €550 million, and completed at a cost of €600m, the NorNed cable is a bipolar HVDC link with a voltage of ±450 kV and a capacity of 700 MW. NorNed is a joint project of the Norwegian transmission system operator Statnett and its Dutch counterpart TenneT. The cable system itself and the two converter stations were produced by ABB.

History 
Installation of the first sections started in early 2006 and the final section was laid by the end of 2007. On the Dutch shore, TenneT has connected the cable to the 380 kV Dutch high‑voltage grid. In Feda, Statnett has done the same for the 300 kV Norwegian transmission grid. Commercial operation started on 5 May 2008 with a capacity auction. The first commercial power transfer took place on 6 May 2008.

After two months of operation, the cable generated revenues of approximately €50 million. In the business case drawn up for the NorNed cable, annual revenues were estimated at €64 million.

NorNed has been included in European Market Coupling Company operations as of 12 January 2011. The internal grid in Norway is sometimes not capable of handling enough power for NorNed and Cross-Skagerrak, and capacity for these cables is then artificially limited.

The cable had a fault in 2011, causing 7 weeks out of operation.

A fault was discovered in May 2022, causing a shutdown of operations. Operations are expected to resume in October 2022.

Technology 
Although classed as a "bipolar" HVDC scheme, the NorNed scheme is unusual for a Line-Commutated (thyristor-based) HVDC scheme since there is just one 12-pulse converter at each end of the scheme, midpoint-grounded at Eemshaven. With voltage-source converter-based HVDC systems, this arrangement with the two high voltage cables at equal and opposite voltages but only a single converter at each end is referred to as a Symmetrical monopole.

Consequently, with a DC voltage of ±450 kV, the converter for the NorNed project has a terminal to terminal DC voltage rating of 900 kV, making it (as of 2012) the highest voltage rating of any HVDC converter in the world. The connection has a loss of 4.2% (95.8% efficiency).

Sites

Trading mechanism 

NorNed is the first power link between the Nordic electrical transmission system Nordel and the continent that is planned to be open to the power market. The main trading over the link is presumed to be one day ahead spot market trading based on the price difference between the markets. In spite of quite equal average spot market prices, the hour-by-hour differences are quite significant most of the time. The way the power exchanges will be compensated was to be agreed, and the direct net income from the trade is to be shared 50/50 between TenneT and Statnett.

See also 
Dutch cables: BritNed, COBRAcable
Norwegian cables: Cross-Skagerrak, NordLink, North Sea Link
Proposed: NorGer, Scotland-Norway interconnector
Others: Basslink - second longest submarine power cable.
Renewable energy in Norway
Renewable energy in the Netherlands

References

External links 

 The NorNed Project (Statnett website)
 The NorNed Project (TenneT website)
 The NorNed Project (ABB website)
 4c page
 Weekly exchange (Nord Pool data)

Electrical interconnectors to and from the Nordic grid
Electrical interconnectors to and from the Synchronous Grid of Continental Europe
Electric power infrastructure in Norway
Electric power infrastructure in the Netherlands
Energy infrastructure completed in 2008
HVDC transmission lines
Netherlands–Norway relations
Electrical interconnectors in the North Sea
2008 establishments in the Netherlands
2008 establishments in Norway